Midob may refer to:
the Midob people
the Midob language